Michel Bouquet (born 13 July 1951) is a French equestrian. He competed in two events at the 1992 Summer Olympics.

References

1951 births
Living people
French male equestrians
Olympic equestrians of France
Equestrians at the 1992 Summer Olympics
Sportspeople from Aubervilliers